Burnaby-Willingdon was a provincial electoral district for the Legislative Assembly of British Columbia, Canada from 1966 to 2009.

Demographics

Election results 

|-

|-

External links 
BC Stats
Results of 2001 election (pdf)
2001 Expenditures (pdf)
Results of 1996 election
1996 Expenditures
Results of 1991 election
1991 Expenditures
Website of the Legislative Assembly of British Columbia

Former provincial electoral districts of British Columbia
Politics of Burnaby